The 1977 Central American Games Football Tournament took place in November and December 1977. The competition was won by El Salvador.

Teams

Standings

Results

References

External links 

Results

Football at the Central American Games